Corno dei Tre Signori is a mountain in Lombardy, Italy.

References

Mountains of Lombardy
Mountains of the Alps
Alpine three-thousanders
Ortler Alps